Bitter Moon is a 1992 Franco-British-American romantic thriller film directed by Roman Polanski.

Bitter Moon may also refer to:
"Bitter Moon", a single by bassist Mark King of Level 42
Luna Amară (aka Bitter Moon), a Romanian alternative rock/grunge band